State Route 134 (SR 134) is an east-west state route located in Covington, Coffee, Dale, Henry, and Houston counties in Alabama.  It loosely parallels U.S. Route 84 (US 84) between Opp and the Chattahoochee River.

Route description
The route begins at US 331/US 84 along the Opp Bypass.  It heads east into southern Coffee County, intersecting SR 189 and SR 87 en route to Enterprise.  Upon reaching Enterprise, it does not follow Boll Weevil Circle around Enterprise but instead continues through the city via Damascus Rd, Main St, and East Park Ave.  Between Enterprise and Daleville, it is concurrent with US 84, crossing into Dale County en route.  In Daleville, it turns off of US 84 for a brief concurrency with SR 85 before turning east and northeast towards Newton.  After a concurrency with SR 123 in Newton, it continues east to Midland City, intersecting US 231 en route.

SR 134 follows 3rd St and Kelly Ave through Midland City before continuing east and passing around the north side of the Dothan Regional Airport.  It crosses into Henry County en route to Headland, meeting SR 173.  After intersecting US 431, SR 134 continues easterly, ending at SR 95 just north of Columbia shortly after entering Houston County.

History 
Prior to September, 2010, SR 134 turned east in Headland onto East Church St and did not continue north on Main St to intersect SR 173.

Major intersections

References

2015-16 Official Alabama Highway Map.  Accessed April 27, 2017.

Alabama Department of Transportation Fiscal Year 2015 Report  Accessed April 27, 2017.

Alabama Department of Transportation Milepost and General County Maps.  Accessed April 27, 2017.

External links

Alabama State Highway 134 (Adam Froehlig website)

134
Transportation in Covington County, Alabama
Transportation in Coffee County, Alabama
Transportation in Dale County, Alabama
Transportation in Henry County, Alabama
Transportation in Houston County, Alabama